The Baja California leopard lizard (Gambelia copeii), also known commonly as Cope's leopard lizard, is a species of lizard in the family Crotaphytidae. The species is endemic to Baja California and adjacent southern California.

Etymology
The specific name, copeii, is in honor of American herpetologist and paleontologist Edward Drinker Cope.

Description
The dorsal pattern appears mottled or ocellated. There are light crossbars on the dorsum, and light gray or white on the venter. It has small granular scales. The large head is distinct from the neck, and the lining of the mouth and throat is purplish-black. Juvenile lizards are similar to adults, but have more distinct banding across the dorsum. Females develop red-orange blotches on the ventral side during breeding season. Males have femoral pores.

Biology
The Baja California leopard lizard is an uncommon species. It is a powerful bipedal runner. An adult can inflict a painful bite. It prefers chaparral habitats with an open understory.

Sources
 This article is based on a description from the website of Robert N. Fisher and Ted J. Case, "A Field Guide to the Reptiles and Amphibians of Coastal Southern California", US Geological Survey. http://www.werc.usgs.gov/fieldguide/index.htm.

References

Further reading
McGuire, Jimmy A. (1996). "Phylogenetic Systematics of Crotaphytid Lizards (Reptilia: Iguania: Crotaphytidae)". Bulletin of the Carnegie Museum of Natural History (32): 1-142. (Gambelia copeii, pp. 98–102).
Stebbins RC (2003). A Field Guide to Western Reptiles and Amphibians, Third Edition.  The Peterson Field Guide Series ®. Boston and New York: Houghton Mifflin. xiii + 533 pp., 56 plates, 204 maps. . (Gambelia copeii, pp. 276–277 + Plate 26 + Map 84).
Yarrow HC (1882). "Descriptions of New Species of Reptiles and Amphibians in the United States National Museum". Proceedings of the United States National Museum 5: 438-443). (Crotaphytus copeii, new species, p. 441).

Gambelia
Reptiles of Mexico
Reptiles described in 1882
Taxa named by Henry Crécy Yarrow